Pînzăreni is a commune in Fălești District, Moldova. It is composed of two villages, Pînzăreni and Pînzărenii Noi.

Notable people
Valeriu Ghilețchi

References

Communes of Fălești District